FC Neftyanik Ufa was a Russian football team from Ufa. It played professionally in 1947, from 1957 to 1995 and from 2002 to 2005. It played on the second-highest level (Soviet First League and Russian First Division) in 1947, 1957–1962, 1966–1969 and 1992. A new team from Ufa, FC Bashinformsvyaz-Dynamo Ufa, started playing professionally in 2009.

Team name history
 1947–1956 Krylia Sovetov Ufa
 1957 Neftyanik Ufa
 1958 Devon Ufa
 1959–1976 Stroitel Ufa
 1977–1992 Gastello Ufa
 1993 KDS Samrau Ufa
 1994 Estel Ufa
 1995–1996 Agidel Ufa
 1997 Stroitel Ufa
 1998 Voskhod Ufa
 1999–2003 Stroitel Ufa
 2004–2005 Neftyanik Ufa

External links
  Team history at KLISF

 
Association football clubs established in 1947
Association football clubs disestablished in 2006
Defunct football clubs in Russia
Sport in Ufa
1947 establishments in Russia
2006 disestablishments in Russia